William Albert Pommer (15 May 1895 – 5 November 1971) was a Liberal party member of the House of Commons of Canada. He was born in Virden, Manitoba.

Pommer studied at Chicago's Northwestern University and the University of Toronto where he received his degree to practice dentistry. He participated in World War I with the Canadian Expeditionary Force's Dental Corps. Between 1932 and 1948 he was mayor of Manitou, Manitoba.

He was first elected to Parliament at the Lisgar riding in the 1953 general election. After serving in the 22nd Canadian Parliament, he was defeated in the 1957 election by George Muir of the Progressive Conservative party.

References

External links
 

1895 births
1971 deaths
Canadian dentists
Liberal Party of Canada MPs
Mayors of places in Manitoba
Members of the House of Commons of Canada from Manitoba
People from Virden, Manitoba
People from Manitou, Manitoba
20th-century dentists
Canadian expatriates in the United States